Dendropoma corallinaceus, common name the colonial worm shell, is a species of sea snail, a marine gastropod mollusk in the family Vermetidae, the worm snails or worm shells.

Description
This snail is a filter feeder that spins a mucus net.

Distribution
Found on the cape of South Africa.

References

Vermetidae